Chet, Floyd & Danny is the title of a recording by Chet Atkins, Floyd Cramer and Danny Davis. Davis was the creator of the Nashville Brass, which recorded country songs with brass instruments.

Chet, Floyd & Danny was nominated for the Best Country & Western Instrumental Performance Grammy in 1978. It did not win. Chet was up against himself in the same category since Me and My Guitar was also nominated.

Track listing

Side 1:
 "La Chicana" (Chet, Floyd & Danny)
 "Java" (Floyd)
 "I Saw the Light" (Hank Williams) (Danny)
 "Black Mountain Rag" (Traditional) (Chet)
 "Under the Double Eagle" (Wagner) (Danny)

Side 2:
 "Four in the Morning" (Chet, Floyd & Danny)
 "Kentucky" (Chet)
 "Wabash Cannonball" (Danny)
 "Main Theme from The Young and the Restless: Nadia's Theme" (Floyd)
 "When You Wish Upon a Star" (Ned Washington, Leigh Harline) (Chet)
 "Last Date" (Floyd)

Personnel
Chet Atkins – guitar
Floyd Cramer - piano
The Nashville Brass - horns

1977 albums
Chet Atkins albums
Floyd Cramer albums
Danny Davis (country musician) albums
Albums produced by Bob Ferguson (music)
Albums produced by Chet Atkins
RCA Records albums